The Bipartisan Budget Act of 2018 is a federal statute concerning spending and the budget in the United States, that was signed into law by President Donald Trump on February 9, 2018.  Delays in the passage of the bill caused a nine-hour funding gap.  The bill is the third in a series that increased spending caps originally imposed by the Budget Control Act of 2011; the first two were the Bipartisan Budget Act of 2013 and the Bipartisan Budget Act of 2015.

Provisions 

The bill combined several provisions, including:
 It included a continuing resolution (with short title Further Extension of Continuing Appropriations Act, 2018) lasting until March 23, 2018.
 Spending caps imposed by the Budget Control Act of 2011 were increased for both defense and nondefense spending, although defense spending was increased more.  The defense discretionary funding cap was increased by $80 billion in FY2018 and $85 billion in FY 2019, while the non-defense domestic discretionary spending cap was increased by $63 billion in FY2018 and $68 billion in FY2019.
 It included the Family First Prevention Services Act, which significantly expands the federal funding available for prevention services that keep children out of the foster care system.
 It included almost $90 billion for hurricane relief efforts in Puerto Rico, the United States Virgin Islands, Florida, and Texas, as well as for the 2017 California wildfires.
 It includes an additional four years of authorization for the Children's Health Insurance Program (CHIP) on top of the six years that was authorized earlier in 2018.
 It suspended the debt ceiling until March 1, 2019.
 It removed 20 year old health care therapy cap related to physical and occupational therapy.
 Several tax provisions were included, which would cost $17.4 billion over four years.  The endowment tax that had been imposed by the Tax Cuts and Jobs Act of 2017 was narrowed slightly to affect only schools with at least 500 tuition-paying students.  The bill also creates or extends tax breaks for racehorses; film, television, and live theater productions; advanced nuclear power facilities; whistleblower awards; plug-in electric motorcycles; fuel cell motor vehicles; biodiesel, energy-efficient home construction, and many renewable energy facilities.
 It repeals the Independent Payment Advisory Board (IPAB) that was part of the Affordable Care Act.
 For the 2017 tax year only, several provisions affecting relatively large numbers of individual taxpayers, including the "above-the-line" deduction for certain post-secondary tuition costs (Form 8917), the exclusion from gross income for discharged mortgage debt for a principal residence (Form 982), and the Schedule A itemized deduction for mortgage insurance premiums were retroactively restored. The IRS updated several 2017 tax forms to reflect these extensions on February 23, 2018; taxpayers affected by the change who filed a return before this date can file an amended return (Form 1040X) to claim these tax adjustments.
 The BBA of 2018 reinstated the nonbusiness energy property credit for 2017, and it reinstated the residential energy efficient property credit for qualified small wind energy property costs, qualified geothermal heat pump property costs, and qualified fuel cell property costs to the end of 2021.  These had expired in 2016, and the 2017 Form 5695 available prior to the passage the bill had 8 lines of "Reserved for Future Use."  
 It expanded the availability of hardship withdrawals from Section 401(k) retirement plans.

References

External links 
 Bipartisan Budget Act of 2018 (PDF/details) as amended in the GPO Statute Compilations collection
 Bipartisan Budget Act of 2018 (PDF/details) as enacted in the US Statutes at Large

Acts of the 115th United States Congress
United States federal budgets
Government finances in the United States
Presidency of Donald Trump
United States federal appropriations legislation